August Labitzky (22 October 1832, Petschau – 29 August 1903, Bad Reichenhall) was a Bohemian composer and kapellmeister, and the son of Joseph Labitzky. Although Labitzky was not as prolific a composer as his father, his Ouverture Characteristique has been occasionally recorded. Written in 1858, it depicts Emperor Charles IV while out hunting.  Labitzky also wrote At the Mountain Inn, Idyl around April 1874.

References

External links
 

1832 births
1903 deaths
People from Bečov nad Teplou
People from the Kingdom of Bohemia
German Bohemian people
Austrian classical composers
Male conductors (music)
Czech male classical composers
Austrian male classical composers
Czech conductors (music)
Czech Romantic composers
20th-century Austrian conductors (music)
20th-century Austrian male musicians
19th-century Czech male musicians